"Lost in the Fire" is a 2019 single by Gesaffelstein featuring The Weeknd.

Lost in the Fire may also refer to:

 Lost in the Fire, a 2018 hip-hop album by the Arsonists

See also
Things We Lost in the Fire (disambiguation)